The Hotel Metropole in Szczecin was a hotel, which was located at the corner of today's Holy Spirit Street and Podwale streets, in the Old Town, in the Centre district. It was destroyed in the Second World War.

History 
The Hotel Metropole was built between 1900 and 1901 on then Heiligegeiststraße 7b. The building had a total of 100 rooms and was one of the largest hotel buildings in pre-war Szczecin. A swimming pool, garages and a restaurant were also available to guests.

Description 
The Metropole Hotel was a corner, four-storey building. The wing from the side of the Holy Spirit Street was seven-axial, whereas from the side of Podwale Street – one axis shorter. The façade of the first and second floor was decorated with bossage. The main entrance was located in the corner of the building. The façade of the upper storeys was divided by cornices. The roof was covered by tiles. The corner crowned a tented roof with a spire.

The hotel was destroyed during the bombing of Szczecin. After the war, its ruins were cleared away and since then the space has been used as a temporary bus parking.

Guests 
At the end of January 1907, Ida Altmann, a German activist of the proletarian women's movement, spent the night at the Hotel Metropole. On 21 January 1907 she sent a letter from this hotel to her friend and future husband, Jager Bronn.

References 

Former buildings and structures in Szczecin
Buildings and structures completed in 1901
Buildings and structures demolished in the 1940s
Old Town, Szczecin
Defunct hotels in Szczecin
Buildings and structures destroyed during World War II
Defunct hotels
Demolished hotels